John Wesley Ewell (born March 25, 1957) is an American serial killer and former activist who murdered four residents of the Hawthorne neighborhood in Los Angeles in 2010. Ewell had previous convictions for violent crimes dating back to the 1980s, and in the 1990s and 2000s he advocated against California's "3-strikes law". During his time advocating, he appeared in a 2006 episode of The Montel Williams Show to express his opinion. Following a guilty plea in 2019, he was sentenced to four consecutive life terms without parole.

Early life 
Ewell was born on March 25, 1957, in Los Angeles. Not much is known about his childhood, but throughout his life, he had a lengthy criminal record. In 1985, he was arrested for forcing a woman to withdraw money from an ATM at gunpoint, and was also separately arrested after forcing a man out of a parked truck, binding him, and stealing his wallet.

In 1989 he was convicted of robbery and burglary. In 1995, he was arrested was charged with check forgery, and, under California's 3-strike law, he was made available for a possible 25-year to life sentence. However, under the agreement of a plea deal, he was sentenced to seven years in prison.

After his release, he found a job as a hairdresser and worked partially as a handyman. He also starting advocating in protest against the 3-strike law. In 2006, Ewell was one of several guests to appear in an epsisode of Montel Williams's talk show "The Montel Williams Show", where he indicated his fear of going to prison forever.  In 2010, Ewell was arrested in Huntington Park after committing a burglary. He pleaded guilty to the crime. He remained free awaiting sentencing when he was re-arrested after he was caught shoplifting. For that crime, he was released on $20,000 bail.

Murders 
Ewell committed his first murder on September 24, 2010, when he broke into the home of 80-year-old Hanna Morcos in Hawthrone. He bound Morcos' hands behind his back using a window cord, and subsequently began to beat him with his fists and a blunt object. The beating ultimately made Marcos suffer a fatal heart attack. Later that day in the afternoon, a family member entered his home and found Marcos' body face down. 

Under a month later, on October 13, Ewell traveled two homes down from where he lived and broke into the home of 53-year-old Denise Roberts. Once again, Ewell bound Roberts hands behind her back, gagged, strangled her to death. He robbed the place, before once again leaving.

Nine days later, on October 21, Ewell, posing as a utility man, entered the home of Leamon Caroll Turnage and his wife Robyn, both 69 and 57, respectively, who had earlier returned from a Florida vacation. Ewell bound the couple one by one, strangled them to death before once again, robbing the house and taking jewelry. Their bodies were discovered by police officers doing a welfare check days later, after they had failed to contact family members. While investigating the Turnage's deaths, police discovered a surveillance video of a black man looting an ATM with Robyn's credit card. 

On October 23, Ewell attempted to use the Tunage's ATM card outside a Shell service station in Gardena. He did not wear a mask and CCTV cams captured images of his face. He was arrested, and by the time of his capture, the four murders had attracted local media attention and fear had been widening among residents. His vehicle was also searched, and police uncovered a newspaper article covering the arrest of Lonnie David Franklin Jr., a man who had been arrested in July 2010 in connection with the murders of ten people in South Los Angeles since 1984.

Court proceedings 
Ewell was to remain in jail until his preliminary hearing, which was continually postponed due to unknown circumstances. As evidence emerged, his lawyers stated that Ewell could have been in jail during some of the killings, however that argument was dismissed. 

In January 2013, Ewell was charged with four counts of first-degree murder and four counts of robbery. He denied committing the crimes and pleaded not guilty. Due to an immediate grand jury indictment, the case was due to head to trial shortly after. Ewell faced a possible death sentence if the case were to go to trial and he was found guilty. In May 2019, Ewell, who up to that point denied being responsible for the murders, accepted a plea deal that allowed him to plead guilty to all four murders in exchange for the death penalty to be taken away. Thus, on July 18, he was sentenced to four consecutive life sentences without the possibility of parole. Ewell was transferred to Valley State Prison in August 2019 to serve his sentence.

See also 
 List of serial killers in the United States

References 

1957 births
20th-century African-American people
20th-century American criminals
African-American people
American male criminals
American people convicted of burglary
American people convicted of murder
American prisoners sentenced to life imprisonment
American rapists
American serial killers
Criminals from Los Angeles
Living people
Male serial killers
People convicted of murder by California
Prisoners sentenced to life imprisonment by California